Venusaur, known in Japan as , is a Grass/Poison-type Pokémon species in Nintendo and Game Freak's Pokémon franchise. Created by Ken Sugimori, Venusaur first appeared in the video games Pokémon Red and Green and subsequent sequels, later appearing in various merchandise, spinoff titles and animated and printed adaptations of the franchise. It is known as the Seed Pokémon. Venusaur is capable of Mega Evolution, which allows it to transform into Mega Venusaur. In Pokémon Sword and Shield, Venusaur has a Gigantamax form, allowing it to transform into a large, special form of itself when it Dynamaxes. It evolves from Ivysaur, which itself evolves from Bulbasaur.

Concept and characteristics
Venusaur was one of 151 different designs conceived by Game Freak's character development team and finalized by Ken Sugimori for the first generation of the Pokémon games Red and Green, which were localized outside Japan as Pokémon Red and Blue. Despite its English name and resemblance to the extinct Pareiasaur, its design was confirmed by Ken Sugimori to be based on a frog. Venusaur was originally named "Fushigibana" in Japanese, which is a combination of the words fushigi and hana, which mean mystery and flower, respectively. Unlike its pre-evolutions, there is a difference between male and female Venusaur. The female has a seed in the center of its flower, while the male lacks it. Nintendo decided to give the various Pokémon species "clever and descriptive names" related to their appearance or features when translating the game for western audiences as a means to make the characters more relatable to American children. As a result, it was renamed Venusaur, which the gaming website IGN wrote was a combination of "venus" from the plant venus flytrap and "saur" from dinosaur.

Known as the Seed Pokémon, Venusaur is the final stage of the Bulbasaur evolution tree. The seed on the back of Bulbasaur bloomed into a huge flower, vaguely resembling a Rafflesia. The flower constantly draws in sunlight for nutrition, characterized by vivid colors and a soothing aroma, and power, which is much more substantial in the summer. They are always on the move to absorb more sunlight, though they usually remain quiet and still while absorbing it. After rain, the aroma is much stronger, which attracts other Pokémon.

Venusaur was given a Mega Evolution about one and a half years into the development of Pokémon X and Y. Bulbasaur, along with Charmander and Squirtle, were added to the game in a significant role in order to allow players to experience its Mega Evolution. When Pokémon Sword and Shield: The Isle of Armor released, Venusaur, along with Blastoise, was given a Gigantamax form. In this Gigantamax form, the petals of the flower on Venusaur's back have grown, having a wider circumference compared to its regular or Mega Evolved forms, and with this Gigantamax form, all Grass-type damaging moves Venusaur knows will become the G-Max Move G-Max Vine Lash, which continuously damages non Grass-type Pokémon for four turns.

Appearances

In the video games
Venusaur first appeared in the video games Pokémon Red and Blue. It served as the mascot for both Pokémon LeafGreen and the Japanese exclusive version of Red and Blue titled Pocket Monsters Green. It evolves from Ivysaur, which evolves from Bulbasaur, one of the three starting Pokémon available to players in most of the above-mentioned games. It has since appeared in every main Pokémon title since. Outside of the main series, Venusaur appears in Pokémon Pinball, Pokémon Trozei!, the Pokémon Mystery Dungeon titles, the Pokémon Ranger titles, Pokémon Rumble and PokéPark Wii: Pikachu's Adventure. In Super Smash Bros., it appears in the Saffron City stage and attacks anyone that comes within range of it. It also appears in Hey You, Pikachu!, where it lives on the Cobalt Coast, saying its name in an echoing voice. In Super Smash Bros. Melee, Venusaur appears as a Pokémon that can be summoned from a Poké Ball to attack opponents, as well as a collectible trophy. In Super Smash Bros. Ultimate, Venusaur appears as a Spirit. If equipped, the fighter will be stronger, but also more vulnerable to fire. Venusaur is one of the several Pokémon in Pokémon X and Y that are able to use the Mega Evolution mechanic, becoming Mega Venusaur.

Venusaur is also available in Pokémon Go. In the first few hours of the gameplay tests in the United States, Australia and New Zealand, Venusaur was the last Pokémon available to be captured. It also appeared in Pokkén Tournament, New Pokémon Snap and Pokémon Unite, where it is available as a reward for gaining battle experience.

In other media
Venusaur has appeared several times in the anime. In Bulbasaur's Mysterious Garden, a wild one was leading an evolution ceremony for Bulbasaur in Kanto. Another Venusaur was the ruler of a forest in Hoenn where grass Pokémon lived. May also had a Bulbasaur that evolved into a Venusaur for Pokémon contests, as it was done to avoid confusing her Bulbasaur with Ash's own Bulbasaur. Venusaur has also been owned by Drake of the Orange Crew, an artist called Gan Gogh, Noland the Factory Head and Spencer the Palace Maven of Hoenn's Battle Frontier, and a business man/guitarist named Jeremy.  In the Pokémon Adventures manga, the character Red receives a Bulbasaur from Professor Oak, which he nicknames Saur. It ultimately evolves into an Ivysaur and In Chapter 33, "The Winged Legends", Red's Ivysaur evolves into a Venusaur to team up with Blue's Charizard and Green's Blastoise to defeat Sabrina's Zapmolcuno (a merged form of Zapdos, Moltres and Articuno) and destroy Team Rocket's control over Saffron City, splitting the three birds in the process. Venusaur is a piece in Pokémon Battle Chess, with its moves resembling a rook in conventional chess.

Reception
Venusaur has received positive reception. Complex's Elijah Watson commented, "most of us grew up" with Venusaur. GamesRadar editor Brett Elston commented that Venusaur "sets the standard for evolutions" - namely that a Pokémon will start off "cute", and then become an "unsightly beast". He noted, however, that while "ugly", Venusaur is also "intimidating". GamesRadar noted Venusaur as Bulbasaur's "greatest drawback", due to its lack of charm. GamesRadar's Carolyn Gudmundson called it one of her "favourite" Pokémon due to it being "ugly" and resembling a cat. Another editor commented that the way its teeth stick resembles the manga cliche of a cat design, while yet another editor commented that he liked the way how Bulbasaur's flower bloomed as it grows into Ivysaur and then Venusaur. Kevin Slackie of Paste listed Venusaur as 21st of the best Pokémon. IGN's Pokémon Chick wrote that since Red and Blue, the Pokémon Charizard had "slightly surpassed Venusaur in terms of popularity". In a poll conducted by IGN, it was voted as the "15th best" Pokémon; IGN staff felt that Venusaur paled in comparison to Charizard and Blastoise due to them being more intimidating. Author Daniel Bischoff chose to not evolve Bulbasaur into Venusaur and stated that Venusaur "just looked kind of fat." Series artist Ken Sugimori noted that Venusaur, while one of his favorite Pokémon,  was his least favourite Pokémon to draw due to its complex design. Official Nintendo Magazines Elizabeth Mo included it on her list of Pokémon she wants to see given a Mega Evolution. Destructoid's Steven Hansen felt that Venusaur's Mega Evolution looked "stupid." An artist RJ Palmer of the film Detective Pikachu made a hyper-realistic Venusaur, it was too scary that Venusaur was only put on the background. Ben Skipper of the International Business Times praised the designs of Venosaur in Pokémon Green.

References

External links

 Venusaur on Bulbapedia
 Venusaur on IMDb
 Venusaur on Pokemon.com

Anthropomorphic dinosaurs
Fictional characters with plant abilities
Fictional frogs
Fictional whip users
Plant characters
Pokémon species
Video game characters introduced in 1996
Fictional dinosaurs
Fictional characters who can change size